The Paços de Brandão Senior Institute, (abbreviated as ISPAB) is an institution in the civil parish of Paços de Brandão, the municipality of Santa Maria da Feira, in the Portuguese district of Aveiro.

History
The Institute was opened in September 1990 to offer classes and training in technology, but founded in 2008. But, it was only officially inaugurated on 11 January 1991, in the presence of the Minister for Engineering Valente de Oliveira, and official representation by then-Prime Minister Aníbal Cavaco Silva.

It was classified as Polytechnical Institute on 29 October 1991 by the Ministry of Education.

ISPAB is owned by the Fundação de Ensino e Desenvolvimento de Paços de Brandão (Fundação de Ensino e Desenvolvimento de Paços de Brandão), with representation from municipal council, academia and business leaders. The school's council expanded theses offerings after a meeting on 3 November 2006, establishing the framework for individualized courses, reinforced by article 46A (Decree Law 115/2013) of the Ministério da Ciência Tecnologia e do Ensino Superior (Ministry of Science Technology and Higher Education) on 7 August 2013.

Structure
Along with administrative services the space includes 18 classrooms, 4 computer laboratories, an audiovisual lab, a business simulation area, photography lab and chemical lab, as well as  auditorium, in addition to studio, meeting rooms and students' areas.

The institute offers polytechnic courses, in addition to licentiate, post-graduate and masters courses:
Polytechnic
 Accounting and management
 Marketing, commerce and sales
Licentiate
 Accounting and management
 Marketing, publicity and public relations
Post-graduate
 Gerontology and geriatrics
 Business management
 Marketing management
 Masters
 Finance
 Education administration and management

References

Notes

Sources
 

Schools in Portugal
Education in Santa Maria da Feira
Buildings and structures in Aveiro District